Sammy Elkayam (born 30 March 1987, in Israel) is a former Israeli professional footballer who plays as a left defender.

Career
Elkayam grew up in the youth department and played for the first team of Hapoel Kfar Saba. He also played in his career at Beitar Tel Aviv Ramla at the third division. He made his only debate in the Israeli Premier League in September 2011, with Ironi Nir Ramat HaSharon against F.C. Ashdod.
He moved to play at the TFF Second League in Turkey, when he signed at Körfez KF in August 2012.
he returned to Israel at January 2013, by signing at Hapoel Ra'anana from the Second Division.

References

External links
 

1987 births
Living people
Israeli footballers
Israeli Premier League players
Liga Leumit players
Hapoel Kfar Saba F.C. players
Beitar Tel Aviv Bat Yam F.C. players
Hapoel Nir Ramat HaSharon F.C. players
Hapoel Ra'anana A.F.C. players
Footballers from Kfar Saba
Expatriate footballers in Turkey
Israeli expatriate sportspeople in Turkey
Association football defenders